Kranji railway station was a railway station on the Singapore-Johore Railway which served Kranji from an unknown date to an unknown date.

History
Kranji railway station was opened to the public on an unknown date as an infill station between Woodlands station and Bukit Panjang station to serve the Kranji area.

As it was decided that Tank Road station was unfit to be the terminus of the line, it was decided that the Bukit Timah-Tank Road section of the line would be abandoned, and the line would instead deviate in between Bukit Panjang station and Bukit Timah station, travelling down a different route which ran along the west of the main town, to a new terminal station at Tanjong Pagar, with a new station being built at Bukit Timah, and two new stations at Tanglin and Alexandra. In November 1955, a new service was introduced in which lorries would arrive at the station in the morning and in the evening to bring people to and fro from work from the station. This was introduced due to the low ridership of the station.

By 1984 the station had already been abandoned and demolished. The site of the former station was one of several possible locations for a railbus station for the railbus line that the Keretapi Tanah Melayu (KTM) planned to built in Singapore.

Routes

References

Defunct railway stations in Singapore